Arthur Jonath (9 September 1909 – 14 April 1963) was a German sprinter.  He competed at the 1932 Summer Olympics in the 4 × 100 m, 100 m and 200 m events and finished in second, third and fourth place, respectively.

Jonath was a boxer, and switched to athletics due to a hand injury. In 1931-1932 he won the German titles in both 100 m and 200 m. He set three indoor world records in the 50 m and 60 m in 1930 and 1931, and two outdoor world records in the 100 m in 1932 and 1933; he set three more world records with the German 4 × 100 m relay team.

After the Los Angeles Games, Jonath stayed in the United States upon invitation from actresses Greta Garbo and Marlene Dietrich. He was offered American citizenship and a university education, but his stepfather brought him back to Germany. Jonath was a guest of honor at the Berlin Olympics. During World War II he fought as an SS officer on the Eastern Front; he was taken prisoner by the Soviet troops and then transferred to an American prisoner-of-war camp near Frankfurt.

After the war Jonath ran a petrol station and trained runners at FSV 1899 Frankfurt. His nephew Ulrich also became a prominent athletic coach.

References

1909 births
1963 deaths
People from Fröndenberg
Sportspeople from Arnsberg (region)
People from the Province of Westphalia
Athletes (track and field) at the 1932 Summer Olympics
German male sprinters
Olympic athletes of Germany
Olympic bronze medalists for Germany
Olympic silver medalists for Germany
Medalists at the 1932 Summer Olympics
Olympic silver medalists in athletics (track and field)
Olympic bronze medalists in athletics (track and field)
Waffen-SS personnel
SS officers
German prisoners of war in World War II held by the Soviet Union
German prisoners of war in World War II held by the United States